County routes in Wayne County, New York, are only posted on street blade signs. Each route number is the product of two different numbering systems, both county-wide in nature. The last two digits of the route number serve as a road's base designation and are assigned sequentially from the Monroe County line in the west to the Cayuga County line in the east and from the Lake Ontario shoreline in the north to the Ontario and Seneca county lines in the south. The first digit of each route's designation indicates where the route is located: routes numbered in the 100s are north of Ridge Road; routes in the 200s are south of Ridge Road and north of New York State Route 31 (NY 31); and routes in the 300s are south of NY 31. If a road crosses either of those highways, the first digit of the route's number changes to reflect the road's location in the latter numbering grid.

Routes ending in an even number run from north to south; routes with an odd designation travel from east to west.

Routes 100–199

Routes 200–299

Routes 300 and up

See also

County routes in New York
List of former state routes in New York (301–400)

References

External links
Empire State Roads – Wayne County Roads